Seraikela-Kharsawan district or Saraikella and Kharaswan district is one of the twenty-four districts of Jharkhand state in eastern India. Seraikela town is the district headquarters of Saraikela Kharsawan district . The district is well known for Seraikela Chhau, one of the three distinctive styles of the chhau dance. This district was carved out from West Singhbhum district in 2001. The district was formed from the Odia princely states of Seraikela and Kharaswan, after the independence of India.

History

Royalty
Members of the erstwhile royal family of Seraikella, the Singh Deo family (patrons of the Chhau dance), divide their time between The Palace, Seraikella; a 300-year-old heritage palace and historical landmark and their residences in Odisha, West Bengal and abroad. The last ruler of the Seraikella princely state was HH Raja Aditya Pratap Singh Deo (grandson of HH Maharaja Udit Narayan Singh Deo) and notables of the era include his sons Tikayet Sahib Nrupendra Narayan Singh Deo, HH Maharaja Sir Rajendra Narayan Singh Deo (given in adoption to Patna-Bolangir state, former Chief Minister of Odisha), Patayet Sahib Maharaj kumar Bhoopendra Narayan Singh Deo (leading regional politician who supported the popular tribal anti-merger movement with Bihar) and Rajkumar Sudhendra Narayan Singh Deo (Param-Guru of Chhau, a Padma Shri awardee).

The Singh Deo royal family remains active in public life (political, cultural and religious) and act as guardians to the Ma Paudi temple located within the royal residence, host the annual Chau festival at the Seraikella Royal Palace and retain a hold on the region's real-estate and business. Despite their loss of formal title and privileges, they enjoy public support in the area (comprising the former Seraikella state). Notable members of the royal family who remain active in the public eye include Rajkumar Pratap Aditya Singh Deo, Rajkumar Juga Bhanu Singh Deo, Maharajkumar Jairaj Singh Deo and Rajkumar Rajvikram Singh Deo. The District of Seraikela and Kharsawan was formed on 1 April 2001 after being separated from West Singhbhum district.

Recent events
The district is currently a part of the Red Corridor.

Geography
The district is situated between 22°29'26" and 23°09'34" north latitudes and 85°30'14" and 86°15'24" east longitudes.

Rivers and lakes
Several rivers flow across Seraikela Kharsawan district. Among these Subarnarekha, Kharkai, Korkori are the important ones. Chandil dam is one of the popular and famous waterbodies of the district. It is located near the Chandil town.

Economy
In 2006 the Ministry of Panchayati Raj named Seraikela Kharsawan one of the country's 250 most backward districts (out of a total of 640). It is one of the 21 districts in Jharkhand currently receiving funds from the Backward Regions Grant Fund Programme (BRGF).

Politics 

 |}

Administration

Blocks/Mandals 
Seraikela Kharsawan district consists of 09 Blocks. The following are the list of the Blocks in Seraikela Kharsawan district:

1 Seraikela,
2 Kharsawan,
3 Gamharia,
4 Kuchai,
5 Ichagarh,
6 Nimdih,
7 Chandil,
8 Rajnagar,
9 Kukru

Divisions
There are three Vidhan Sabha constituencies in this district: Ichagarh, Seraikela and Kharsawan. These are parts of Ranchi, Singhbhum and Khunti Lok Sabha constituencies respectively.

Demographics

According to the 2011 census Seraikela Kharsawan district has a population of 1,065,056, roughly equal to the nation of Cyprus or the US state of Rhode Island. This gives it a ranking of 428th in India (out of a total of 640).
Its population growth rate over the decade 2001-2011 was 25.28%. Saraikela Kharsawan has a sex ratio of 958 females for every 1000 males, and a literacy rate of 68.85%. Scheduled Castes and Scheduled Tribes make up 5.28% and 35.18% of the population respectively.

According to the census, 66.57% of the district practiced Hinduism and 5.97% Islam. Other religions made up 26.33% of the population.

At the time of the 2011 Census of India, 44.01% of the population in the district spoke Bengali as their first Language , 15.62% Santali, 9.65% Ho, 9.48% Odia, 6.98% Hindi, 4.76% Mundari, 2.83% Urdu, 2.7% Bhojpuri and 1.05% Maithili.

In rural areas, Bengali is the main language. Various tribal languages are spoken throughout the district, and Odia is the main language in the west of the district.

References

External links

Seraikela-Kharsawan district website

 
Districts of Jharkhand
2001 establishments in Jharkhand

ca:Kharsawan